The 2020 German Masters (officially the 2020 BetVictor German Masters) was a professional ranking snooker tournament that took place from 29 January to 2 February 2020 in the Tempodrom in Berlin, Germany. The tournament was the tenth ranking event of the 2019–2020 snooker season. It was the 14th edition of the German Masters, first held in 1995 as the 1995 German Open. The event featured a prize fund of £400,000 with £80,000 being given to the winner.

Kyren Wilson was the defending champion after defeating David Gilbert 9–6 in the 2019 final. He lost 4–5 to Zhao Xintong in the second qualifying round. The final was contested between the reigning world champion Judd Trump and Neil Robertson, who had won the preceding European Masters event. Trump won the final defeating Robertson 9–6. Trump's win was his 15th ranking title and fourth of the season.

This tournament was the last professional tournament for Peter Ebdon, who retired due to spine and neck degradation. Ebdon lost 4–5 in the first qualifying round to Matthew Stevens.

Format
The 2020 German Masters was a professional snooker tournament held at the Tempodrom in Berlin, Germany, between 29 January and 3 February 2020. This was the 13th edition of the German Masters tournament, being held since 2011, and previously between 1995 and 1998 as the German Open. It was the tenth ranking event of the 2019–20 snooker season following the European Masters and preceding the World Grand Prix. It was played as the best-of-nine-frames until the semi-finals, which were best-of-11-frames, followed by a best-of-17-frames final. The event featured 32 participants from the World Snooker Tour with two qualifying rounds which took place from 20 to 22 December 2019 in Barnsley, England.

Prize fund
The event featured a total prize fund of £400,000 with the winner receiving £80,000. The event was the second of the "European Series" which included the European Masters, Snooker Shoot Out and Gibraltar Open all sponsored by sports betting company BetVictor. The player accumulating the highest amount of prize money over the four events received a bonus of £150,000. The breakdown of prize money for the tournament is shown below:

 Winner: £80,000
 Runner-up: £35,000
 Semi-final: £20,000
 Quarter-final: £10,000
 Last 16: £5,000
 Last 32: £4,000
 Last 64: £3,000
 Highest break: £5,000
 Total: £400,000

Tournament summary

The first round of the German Masters began on 29 January 2020. A commemorative cake in the shape of a snooker table was baked to celebrate the 10th edition of the event to be held in the Tempodrome. Four-time world champion John Higgins lost his first round match to world number 59 Robbie Williams 4–5. Three players completed a whitewash in the first round, with Sunny Akani, Michael Georgiou and Matthew Selt all winning 5–0. Scott Donaldson defeated 2019 UK Championship winner Ding Junhui 5–4. The win gave Donaldson enough ranking points to qualify for the 2020 World Grand Prix.

In the second round, Georgiou defeated Akani 5–4. Akani continued playing on the practice tables for two days after his loss. European Masters finalist Zhao Xintong defeated 17th seed Gary Wilson 5–1. In a rematch of the 2018 final, 19th seed Graeme Dott played third seed Mark Williams, with Dott winning 5–2. World number two Neil Robertson completed a second straight whitewash over Elliot Slessor in the quarter-finals, having also defeated Mitchell Mann in the second round 5–0. Shaun Murphy defeated Xintong 5–3, Dott defeated Selt 5–2 and Trump defeated Georgiou 5–1. The first semi-final was played between Dott and Trump. With no more than one frame between the two, they tied at 4–4. However, Trump won frame nine with a break of 110 and won the match 6–4. The second semi-final was between Robertson and Murphy. Robertson won five frames in a row with breaks of 73, 136, 62, 53 and 129 to win 6–1. Robertson reached the final having lost only two frames in the previous four matches.

The final was played between Neil Robertson and Judd Trump on 2 February 2020. This was the second time in the 2019–20 snooker season that the pair had met in a final, having done so at the 2019 Champion of Champions. If Robertson won the final, he would be guaranteed to win the European Series. It was held as a best-of-17 frames match, held over two sessions. Robertson won four of the first six frames, with Trump winning the final two frames of the first session to tie the match at 4–4. Trump restarted the match, winning a further two frames to lead 6–4. The pair shared the next two frames, before Trump won the match 9–6 with a break of 120 in frame 15. This was Trump's 15th career ranking event title, his fourth of the season.

Main draw
Below are the event's results from the last-32 stage to the final. Player names in bold denote match winners. Numbers in brackets denote player seedings.

Final

Qualifying
Qualifying for the event took place between 20 and 22 December 2019 at the Barnsley Metrodome in Barnsley, England. There were two rounds of qualifying with matches being played as best-of-9 frames. Defending champion Kyren Wilson did not qualify for the event, after losing 4–5 to Zhao Xintong in the second round. Peter Ebdon played his last professional match in a first round loss to Matthew Stevens.

Round 1

Round 2

Century breaks

Main stage centuries
There was a total of 33 century breaks during the tournament. The highest was a 138 made by John Higgins in his first round win over Robbie Williams.

 138, 134  John Higgins
 136, 133, 129, 120, 101, 101  Neil Robertson
 134, 108  Gary Wilson
 133, 106  Mark Williams
 132  Nigel Bond
 132  Scott Donaldson
 130  Elliot Slessor
 129, 127  Shaun Murphy
 126  Yuan Sijun
 122, 119, 114, 110, 100  Judd Trump
 122, 102  Luca Brecel
 122  Robbie Williams
 121  Graeme Dott
 119  Robert Milkins
 112  Michael Georgiou
 111, 110  Mitchell Mann
 108  Matthew Selt
 102  Sunny Akani

Qualifying stage centuries 
There was a total of 77 century breaks during qualifying. The highest was a 143 made by Tom Ford in his second qualifying round match against Oliver Lines.

 143, 129  Tom Ford
 142, 137, 124  Michael Georgiou
 141  Hossein Vafaei
 140, 106  Robert Milkins
 140  Zhang Anda
 139, 137, 127, 109  Zhao Xintong
 135  John Astley
 135  Louis Heathcote
 134, 131  Yan Bingtao
 133  Liang Wenbo
 133  Zhou Yuelong
 132, 130  Kyren Wilson
 132, 103  Ricky Walden
 131, 111  Kacper Filipiak
 131  Kurt Maflin
 130  Xu Si
 126, 106  Dominic Dale
 126  Mark Davis
 124, 115  Stuart Bingham
 123, 113  Li Hang
 123, 105  Luca Brecel
 122  Kishan Hirani
 119  Jack Lisowski
 118  Ali Carter
 118  Fraser Patrick
 118  Joe Perry
 117  Sam Craigie
 116, 109, 107  Judd Trump
 115, 100, 100  Gary Wilson
 115  Ian Burns
 114, 102, 100  Ashley Carty
 114  Jimmy Robertson
 113  Soheil Vahedi
 111  Noppon Saengkham
 110  Alexander Ursenbacher
 110  Anthony Hamilton
 109  Bai Langning
 109  Lee Walker
 108, 101  Igor Figueiredo
 108  Sam Baird
 107  Andrew Higginson
 106  Barry Hawkins
 104, 103  David Gilbert
 104, 100  Matthew Stevens
 103  Fergal O'Brien
 102  Scott Donaldson
 101  Yuan Sijun
 100, 100  Neil Robertson
 100  Mark Selby
 100  Ryan Day

References

2020
German Masters
Masters
German Masters
German Masters
Sports competitions in Berlin
German Masters